Joseph Vance (March 21, 1786 – August 24, 1852) was a Whig politician from the U.S. state of Ohio. He was the 13th governor of Ohio and the first Whig to hold the position.

Biography
Vance was born in Catfish (now Washington), Pennsylvania. He moved with his father, Joseph C. Vance, a Revolutionary War veteran, to Vanceburg, Kentucky, in 1788, and then to Urbana, Ohio, in 1805. Vance married Mary Lemon in 1807.

Career
A salt farmer, Vance gained a commission during the War of 1812 and rose quickly from Major to Major General. He served in the Ohio House of Representatives in 1812–1813, 1815–1816 and 1818–1819. Elected to the United States House of Representatives in 1820, Vance served seven terms before losing a bid for an eighth term in 1834. Vance ran for governor in 1836 and served a single two-year term, losing a bid for re-election in 1838.

He intended to retire but was elected to the Ohio State Senate, and served in the Senate from 1840 to 1841. Vance ran again for the House of Representatives in 1842 and served two more terms in the House. He did not run for re-election in 1846. Vance was a delegate to the 1848 Whig National Convention and was a member of the Ohio State Constitutional Convention in 1851.

Death
Vance died on August 24, 1852, and was buried at Oak Dale Cemetery.

Legacy
Vance was instrumental in laying out the town of Findlay, Ohio.

References

External links 

1786 births
1852 deaths
Governors of Ohio
Members of the Ohio House of Representatives
Ohio state senators
People from Washington County, Pennsylvania
People from Urbana, Ohio
American militiamen in the War of 1812
Ohio Constitutional Convention (1850)
Ohio Democratic-Republicans
Democratic-Republican Party members of the United States House of Representatives
Ohio National Republicans
National Republican Party members of the United States House of Representatives
Whig Party members of the United States House of Representatives from Ohio
Whig Party state governors of the United States
19th-century American politicians
Burials in Ohio
American militia generals
Military personnel from Pennsylvania